Park Hye-ryun (Korean: 박혜련) is a South Korean screenwriter. She is known for her writing of the popular Korean television dramas Dream High (2011), I Can Hear Your Voice (2013), Pinocchio (2014-2015), While You Were Sleeping (2017), and Start-Up (2020).

Filmography

Television

 From AGB Nielsen nationwide ratings

Film
 Hellcats (2008)

Notes

References

Living people
South Korean screenwriters
South Korean television writers
Date of birth missing (living people)
Year of birth missing (living people)